Nicolas Rigas is a French contemporary theatre director, actor, and baritone.

Biography 

In 2009, on the occasion of years of the Théâtre du petit monde, he directed Le Misanthrope ou l'Atrabilaire amoureux with Delphine Depardieu.

For the reopening of the Algiers Opera House, he staged Don Giovanni which he also sang.

References

External links 
 Nicolas Rigas on Opera Musica
 Nicolas Rigas on Opera Online
 Nicolas Rigas chante les 4 diables dans les contes d'Hoffmann d'Offenbach, mise en scène par Julie Depardieu. on YouTube

French operatic baritones
21st-century French singers
21st-century French male actors
French theatre directors
Living people
Year of birth missing (living people)
21st-century French male singers